The 1922 Goodall Cup Final is the return of the series to Melbourne after the Great War. A ladies ice hockey team was also formed to represent New South Wales and would travel to Melbourne to play a Victorian ladies Ice Hockey team for the first interstate ladies ice hockey competition. This would later be a ladies inter-state competition for the Gower Cup.

The series

Game one
22 July 1922 Victoria was up 2–0 by the end of the first half of the game. The majority of the play was around the New South Wales goals and from in close Ernest Collins scored the first 3 goals for Victoria. New South Wales then scored a goal back when C, Gates scored from the center line. Maurice Bilsborrow would then go on to score on a rush from center to give the Victorians a 4–1 victory over New South Wales in front of the large crowd at the Melbourne Glaciarium.

Game two
24 July 1922 By the end of the first half, the goal scored by Victor Langsford saw the Victorians leading New South Wales by a score of 1–0. Early in the second period Victor Langsford scored again for Victoria and quickly after Ernest Collins scored again to see the Victorians up by 3–0. New South Wales could not break through the Victorian defence and the remained scoreless. Victoria secured the series by winning the second game and the founder of the Goodall Cup, John Edwin Goodall captained the first Victorian team to win the cup since the great war.

Game three
26 July 1922 The third game saw Victoria open the scoring in the first half. New South Wales scored to even the score at 1-1 and that is how the game ended. With Victoria winning the first 2 games the Goodall Cup was already won and presented to the team.

Teams

Victoria
The Victoria team was made from the following players:
 John Edwin Goodall (Captain)
 Maurice Stephen Bilsborrow
 Gordon Langridge
 Ted Molony
 Ernest Arthur Collins
 Ray Alexander
 Victor Langsford
 Mick Harris
 William Dow
 Anthony De Long (Goaltender)

New South Wales
The New South Wales team was made from the following players:
 Jack Pike (Captain) 
 T. Gibson
 C. Kerr
 H. Butler
 Leslie Reid
 F. Joseph
 C. Gates
 H. Ive (Goaltender)

Team Manager – H. Joseph

See also

 Goodall Cup
 Ice Hockey Australia
Australian Ice Hockey League

References

Goodall Cup
1922 in Australian sport
1922 in ice hockey
Sports competitions in Melbourne